The following is a list of the Teen Choice Award winners and nominees for Choice Movie Actress - Comedy.

Winners and nominees

2000s

2010s

Notes

References

Comedy Actress
Awards for actresses